Mount Potts is a specialist backcountry skiing base in South Island, New Zealand. Unlike normal resorts, there are no fixed ski tows or chairlifts. Instead, vertical transport is provided by snowcats and helicopter. The ski area covers 660 hectares and includes, "steep faces, chutes, rocks to drop off, cornices, wide open powder bowls and gullies" 

Mount Potts is an hour's drive from Methven, and two hours' drive from Christchurch; on site there is a modern lodge for accommodation. Although Mount Potts is on private land, it has an easy access point from the Mount Somers road. The area is becoming more popular with tourists, after the filming of The Lord Of The Rings trilogy. Of special interest to these tourists, is the small hill in the centre of the plain, called Mount Sunday, which was the home of Edoras in the films. A recently added trek route has been put in so people can walk up to Mount Sunday and even climb it in relative safety.

See also
Heliskiing
Snowcat

References

External links
http://www.mtpotts.co.nz/

Potts